Maudlin is a hamlet in Cornwall, England situated about 1 km south of Lanhydrock.

References

Hamlets in Cornwall